"Out Is Through" is a song written by Canadian singer-songwriter Alanis Morissette for her sixth studio album, So-Called Chaos (2004). The song was released on July 19, 2004.

Chart performance
The song failed to become a hit despite being marketed heavily outside the US, peaking at number 56 in the United Kingdom.

Music videos
There are two music videos for the song. On one of the videos, Morissette appears with her bandmates during a 2004 performance of the song on the UK weekend youth TV show T4, with the album track replacing the audio. The alternate video is about a fan-girl (Anne Vyalitsyna) running and trying to get to Morissette's different live performances until she finally does.

Track listings

CD1
 "Out Is Through"
 "Spineless" (Vancouver sessions)

CD2
 "Out Is Through"
 "Eight Easy Steps" (Vancouver sessions)
 "This Grudge" (Vancouver sessions)

Charts

References

Alanis Morissette songs
2004 singles
2004 songs
Maverick Records singles
Song recordings produced by John Shanks
Songs written by Alanis Morissette